Glutaryl-coenzyme A is an intermediate in the metabolism of lysine and tryptophan.

See also
 Glutaryl-CoA dehydrogenase

References

Thioesters of coenzyme A